The 1905 VPI football team represented the Virginia Polytechnic Institute in the 1905 college football season. Led by first-year head coach Sally Miles, the team went 9–1 and claims a Southern championship. The team had the most wins in a Virginia Tech season for many years to come, and defeated rival Virginia for the first time. Tech outscored its opponents 305 to 24. Hunter Carpenter scored 82 of those points.

Before the season
The team reported for practice on September 1. "Never in the history of the school have prospects for a winning team been so bright."

Schedule

Season summary

Roanoke

Cumberland
In the second week of play, VPI beat Cumberland  12–0.

at West Point

The upset of the week was VPI's 16–6 win over Army. Carpenter was the star of the game, and made a kick from placement.

VPI's starting lineup was: Webber (left end), Willson (left tackle), Diffendal (left guard), Stiles (center), Strickling (right guard), Hines (right tackle), Lewis (right end), Nutter (quarterback), Treadwell (left halfback), Carpenter (right halfback), Harlan (fullback).

Gallaudet

VPI "had no trouble" in beating Gallaudet 56–0. The starting lineup was Webber (left end), Varner (left tackle), Diffendal (left guard), Stiles (center), Stickling (right guard), Hynes (right tackle), Lewis (right end), Harris (quarterback),   Nutter (left halfback), Carpenter (right halfback), Hollan (fullback).

North Carolina
VPI defeated North Carolina 35–6. Carpenter made "several sensational runs." During the second half VPI "scored almost at will."

at Virginia

Hunter Carpenter had returned to VPI in 1905 for a last shot at beating Virginia in his eighth year of college football. Going into the game, UVA was 8–0 against VPI by a cumulative score of 170–5. The Cavalier Daily ran a story outlining Carpenter's motives and move from VPI to UNC and back to VPI over the preceding eight years. Virginia accused Carpenter of being a professional player, as he had played college football already for nearly a decade.  Carpenter signed an affidavit that he had not received payment to play against UVA and played against a backdrop of recrimination.

Virginia fumbled at midfield, and as a result Carpenter eventually got away for a 30-yard gain around left end. Virginia held VPI on downs at the 3-yard line. Virginia's punt had to go high and short to avoid hitting the goal post. Carpenter called a fair catch in order for a free kick, but was tackled anyway, and the penalty brought the ball back to Virginia's 3-yard line. On third down, Murray Harlan skirted end for a touchdown, and Carpenter added the extra point.

"The second half was even more hotly contested than the first." Carpenter "finally" got off  a long punt, down to Virginia's 5-yard line. VPI blocked Virginia's ensuing punt, and on third down Carpenter dashed through left tackle for the final score. Carpenter was later ejected for throwing the ball at the face of a Virginia defender, but stayed on the sidelines to watch as neither team was able to score against each other. Carpenter left immediately after the game and moved to Middleton, New York, never to return to the Commonwealth. Carpenter retired 1–7 against UVA, but Virginia still refused to play VPI again until 1923.

VPI's starting lineup was: Webber (left end), Willson (left tackle), Cunningham (left guard), Stiles (center), Strickling (right guard), Hines (right tackle), Lewis (right end), Nutter (quarterback), Treadwell (left halfback), Carpenter (right halfback), Harlan (fullback).

South Carolina
VPI beat South Carolina 34–0. Captain Lewis asked for the game to be called after eight minutes' phlay in the second half, as the crowd surged on the field and play was impossible. South Carolina did not earn a single first down. Carpenter had one run of 68 yards.

VPI's starting lineup was: Webber (left end), Willson (left tackle), Cunningham (left guard), Tomson (center), Strickling (right guard), Hines (right tackle), Lewis (right end), Harris (quarterback), Nutter (left halfback), Carpenter (right halfback), Hanley (fullback).

at Navy

VPI suffered its sole loss of the season against Navy, getting revenge for when Carpenter and VPI won in 1903. VPI scored when Carpenter returned the second-half kickoff 95 yards, after a hand-off from Murray Harlan who caught the kick.

VPI's starting lineup was: Webber (left end), Willson (left tackle), Cunningham (left guard), Stiles (center), Strickling (right guard), Hines (right tackle), Lewis (right end), Harris (quarterback), Nutter (left halfback), Carpenter (right halfback), Harlan (fullback).

vs. VMI
The season closed with a 34–0 win over old rival VMI. "The story of the contest may be summed up in the statement that the Lexington boys were outclassed." The crowd did not exceed 5,000 due to the cold weather. Byrd, Fraser, Harlan, and Beckner were all injured. Nutter, Cox, Harvey, and Harlan starred.

VPI's starting lineup was: Webber (left end), Diffendal (left tackle), Cunningham (left guard), Stiles (center), Stickling (right guard), Hines (right tackle), Lewis (right end), Nutter (quarterback), Cox (left halfback), Hanvey (right halfback), Harlan (fullback).

Postseason
Six players made W&L coach R. R. Brown's All-Southern team.

Players
The following players were members of the 1905 football team according to the roster published in the 1906 edition of The Bugle, the Virginia Tech yearbook.

References

VPI
Virginia Tech Hokies football seasons
VPI football